Karl Ferdinand Braun (6 June 1850 – 20 April 1918) was a German electrical engineer, inventor, physicist and Nobel laureate in physics. Braun contributed significantly to the development of radio and television technology: he shared the 1909 Nobel Prize in Physics with Guglielmo Marconi "for their contributions to the development of wireless telegraphy", was a founder of Telefunken, one of the pioneering communications and television companies, and has been both called the "father of television" (shared with inventors like Paul Gottlieb Nipkow) and the co-father of the radio telegraphy, together with Marconi.

Biography
Braun was born in Fulda, Germany, and educated at the University of Marburg and received a PhD from the University of Berlin in 1872. In 1874, he discovered that a point-contact metal–semiconductor junction rectifies alternating current. He became director of the Physical Institute and professor of physics at the University of Strassburg in 1895.

In 1897, he built the first cathode-ray tube (CRT) and cathode ray tube oscilloscope. The CRT became the cornerstone in developing fully electronic television, being a part of every TV, computer and any other screen set up till the introduction of the LCD screen at the end of the 20th century. It is still mostly called the "Braun tube" in German-speaking countries and other countries such as Korea (브라운관: Buraun-kwan) and Japan (: Buraun-kan).

During the development of radio, he also worked on wireless telegraphy. In 1897, Braun joined the line of wireless pioneers. His major contributions were the introduction of a closed tuned circuit in the generating part of the transmitter, its separation from the radiating part (the antenna) by means of inductive coupling, and later on the usage of crystals for receiving purposes. Around 1898, he invented a crystal detector . Wireless telegraphy claimed Dr. Braun's full attention in 1898, and for many years after that he applied himself almost exclusively to the task of solving its problems. Dr. Braun had written extensively on wireless subjects and was well known through his many contributions to the Electrician and other scientific journals. In 1899, he would apply for the patent Wireless electro transmission of signals over surfaces. Also in 1899, he is said to have applied for a patent on Electro telegraphy by means of condensers and induction coils .

Pioneers working on wireless devices eventually came to a limit of distance they could cover. Connecting the antenna directly to the spark gap produced only a heavily damped pulse train. There were only a few cycles before oscillations ceased. Braun's circuit afforded a much longer sustained oscillation because the energy encountered less losses swinging between coil and Leyden Jars. And by means of inductive antenna coupling the radiator was better matched to the generator. The resultant stronger and less bandwidth consuming signals bridged a much longer distance.

Braun invented the phased array antenna in 1905. He described in his Nobel Prize lecture how he carefully arranged three antennas to transmit a directional signal. This invention led to the development of radar, smart antennas, and MIMO.

Braun's British patent on tuning was used by Marconi in many of his tuning patents. Guglielmo Marconi used Braun's patents (among others).  Marconi would later admit to Braun himself that he had "borrowed" portions of Braun's work  . In 1909, Braun shared the Nobel Prize for physics with Marconi for "contributions to the development of wireless telegraphy". The prize awarded to Braun in 1909 depicts this design. Braun experimented at first at the University of Strasbourg. Not before long he bridged a distance of 42 km to the city of Mutzig. In spring 1899, Braun, accompanied by his colleagues Cantor and Zenneck, went to Cuxhaven to continue their experiments at the North Sea. On 24 September 1900 radio telegraphy signals were exchanged regularly with the island of Heligoland over a distance of 62 km. Light vessels in the river Elbe and a coast station at Cuxhaven commenced a regular radio telegraph service.

Braun went to the United States at the beginning of World War I (before the U.S. had entered the war) to be a witness for the defense in a lawsuit regarding a 
patent claim by the Marconi Corporation against the wireless station of Telefunken at Sayville, New York. After the US entered the war, Braun was detained, but could move freely within Brooklyn, New York. Braun died in his house in Brooklyn, before the war ended in 1918.

SID Karl Ferdinand Braun Prize
In 1987 the Society for Information Display created the Karl Ferdinand Braun Prize, awarded for an outstanding technical achievement in display technology.

Patents

See also
History of radio
Invention of radio
Edouard Branly

References
Footnotes

General
K.F. Braun: "On the current conduction in metal sulphides (title translated from German into English)", Ann. Phys. Chem., 153 (1874), 556. (In German) An English translation can be found in "Semiconductor Devices: Pioneering Papers", edited by S.M. Sze, World Scientific, Singapore, 1991, pp. 377–380.
Keller, Peter A.: The cathode-ray tube: technology, history, and applications. New York: Palisades Press, 1991. .
Keller, Peter A.: "The 100th Anniversary of the Cathode-Ray Tube," Information Display, Vol. 13, No. 10, 1997, pp. 28–32.
F. Kurylo: "Ferdinand Braun Leben und Wirken des Erfinders der Braunschen Röhre Nobelpreis 1909", München: Moos Verlag, 1965. (In German)

External links

 including the Nobel Lecture, 11 December 1909 Electrical Oscillations and Wireless Telegraphy
Naughton, Russell, "Karl Ferdinand Braun, Dr : 1850 – 1918".
"Karl Ferdinand Braun ".  Biographies of Famous Electrochemists and Physicists Contributed to Understanding of Electricity.
"Karl Ferdinand Braun, 1850–1918". (German) (English translation)
The Ferdinand-Braun-Institut fuer Hoechstfrequenztechnik Berlin, Germany
Alfred Thomas Story A Story of Wireless Telegraphy. D. Appleton and company 1904

1850 births
1918 deaths
20th-century German physicists
People from the Electorate of Hesse
Experimental physicists
19th-century German inventors
German Nobel laureates
19th-century German physicists
Television pioneers
Humboldt University of Berlin alumni
Nobel laureates in Physics
Academic staff of the Karlsruhe Institute of Technology
University of Marburg alumni
Academic staff of the University of Marburg
Academic staff of the University of Strasbourg
Academic staff of the University of Tübingen
Academic staff of the University of Würzburg
People from Fulda
20th-century German inventors